Nicole Mieth (born 23 July 1990) is a German actress.

Life and career 
Born in Calw, Mieth grew up in an artistic environment and is the granddaughter of actor Benno Mieth.

Mieth has acted in various television films and television series. In 2001, her debut role was Lilli Leonhard in the television film Herzstolpern, a romantic comedy produced for ZDF. Mieth played the role of Emma Jacobsson in the television film Sehnsucht nach Marielund (2003), the opening film of the successful Inga Lindström television series. In the Das Traumschiff episode Samoa she played the role of the young Marlene Haas.

She has had episode-appearances in the series Der letzte Zeuge, Im Namen des Gesetzes, Unser Charly and Cologne P.D.. From 2008 to 2011, Mieth completed acting training at the International Drama Academy CreArte in Stuttgart. In April 2011, she acted in the ZDF crime series Die Rosenheim-Cops in an episode role as Julia Kammermeier. In May 2011,  (episode 3837) she took over the role of Kim Wolf in the Daily Soap Verbotene Liebe on ARD and continued in the role until the end of the series in June 2015.

Mieth has appeared in commercials, including for BMW and Osram. She also had two YouTube channels, which are now both inactive.

In January 2017, she participated in Season 11 of Ich bin ein Star – Holt mich hier raus! and took ninth place. Before moving into the jungle camp, she completed a shoot for the February 2017 issue of German Playboy. Mieth took part in an episode of Das perfekte Promi-Dinner in March 2017.

In June 2017, Mieth moved from Stuttgart to Vienna.

Filmography

Films 
2001: Herzstolpern
2003: Inga Lindström: – Sehnsucht nach Marielund
2004: Das Traumschiff – Samoa

Series 
2001: Herzschlag – Das Ärzteteam Nord
2003: Tatort – Das Phantom
2004: Cologne P.D. – Oliver W, Death of a Student
2004: Der letzte Zeuge – The Forgotten Death
2004: Im Namen des Gesetzes – In Acquittal Murder
2004: Stefanie
2005: Cologne P.D. – The Sniper
2005: Tatort: Der doppelte Lott
2006: Unser Charly
2009: Muetze (pilot film)
2011: Die Rosenheim-Cops – Inheritance with Consequences
2011: Aktenzeichen XY… ungelöst
2011–15: Verbotene Liebe

Reality TV 
2017: Ich bin ein Star – Holt mich hier raus!
2017: Das perfekte Promi-Dinner (episode from 19 Mar)

References

External links 

 
 
 

German film actresses
1990 births
People from Calw
Ich bin ein Star – Holt mich hier raus! participants
Living people